The Battle of Čelopek was fought at the Čelopek plateau, near Kozjak, between the Serbian Chetnik Organization and Ottoman officers accompanied by Ottoman Albanian bashi-bozuks, on 16 April 1905.

Background

After the fights in Tabanovce, Savatije Milošević, Lazar Kujundžić and Aksentije Bacetović-Baceta left their offices as organizers of the action, wanting to feel the Chetnik lifestyle "from within" as voivodes. Baceta was to replace the then Chief of Upper Staff, Ilija Jovanović. Baceta and Savatije Milošević, by mid-April, had moved 107 fighters across the border.

Fight

At dawn on Holy Saturday, the two large bands (Cheta) -- Belgrade and Kragujevac -- arrived at the village of Dubočica. There, they were awaited by the bands of Ilija Jovanović, Lazar Kujundžić, Čiča-Pavle Mladenović and Ljubomir Jezdić. The Kragujevac Band was led by captain (kapetan) Borko Paštrović and had the sub-lieutenants (potporučnici): Vojin Popović-Vuk, Dušan Jezdić, Petar Todorović and Dušan Putniković. The Belgrade Band was led by Baceta, and included Savatije Mihailović, officers (oficiri) Janićije Mićić, Bogdan Jugović Hajnc, Vojislav Tankosić, Branivoj Jovanović and non-commissioned officers (podoficiri) Jović, Radul Kosovac, Novica Leovac, Radoš Vasiljević, Trajko and Radivoje Ilić. They were also accompanied with the bands of Stevan Nedić and Doksim Mihailović, which had been returned to western Povardarje after vacationing in Belgrade.

On , at the heights of Čelopek, around 120 chetniks under the command of voivodes Doksim, Čiča-Pavle, Baceta, Kujundžić, Paštrović, Skopljanče, Tankosić and Dovezenski fought a uniformed Ottoman army accompanied by Albanians from the surrounding villages.  During the battle Čiča-Pavle took the Čelopek heights and thus prevented the encirclement of the bands from the Albanian bashi-bozuks; overtaking the three peaks gave the chetniks a strategical advantage and after the victorious fight they made heavy losses to the Turks and Albanians (over 200 dead and wounded), while only having two dead (Petar Todorović and Radul Kosovac) according to Serbian sources, while British Vice-Consul Wilfred Gilbert Thesiger claimed in a letter dated  that fighting near Kumanovo 'the earlier day' had taken 4 Serbian officers' lives, and 8 captured.

Aftermath

The victory enraged the Ottomans, who began manhunting the rebels.  The rebels were forced to retreat across the border, and were dispersed. Čiča-Pavle and Bacetović were surrounded by the Ottoman army near the village of Beljakovce (today's Kriva Palanka) on 16 June, and everyone in their bands were killed.

On 21 January 1906, another fight took place in the same place, in which Vasilije Trbić nearly lost his whole band (22 men) to the Ottomans.

References

Sources

Battles of the Ottoman–Serbian Wars
Military history of North Macedonia
1905 in the Ottoman Empire
1905 in Serbia
Conflicts in 1905
Chetniks of the Macedonian Struggle
April 1905 events